Ailton Cesar Junior Alves da Silva (18 November 1994 – 28 November 2016), known as Ailton Canela or simply Canela, was a Brazilian footballer who played for Chapecoense.

Canela was one of the 71 people who died in LaMia Airlines Flight 2933 accident, including 18 of his teammates.

Club career
Canela was born in Matão, São Paulo, and joined Internacional de Bebedouro through a youth programme held in his hometown, in 2010. He made his senior debut on 29 February 2012, coming on as a substitute in a 1–0 Campeonato Paulista Série A2 away win against Osvaldo Cruz.

Canela signed for Vitória-ES ahead of the 2013 season. In the middle of the year, however, he moved to Monte Azul to play in the year's Copa Paulista.

In July 2014, Canela was loaned to Olímpia until the end of the year. Returning in the following January, he became a starter before joining Botafogo-SP on 30 June 2015.

Canela became a starter for Bota during the end of the campaign, scoring two goals as his side achieved promotion as champions. On 12 January 2016, after failing to agree new terms, he signed a pre-contract with Cianorte.

On 9 June 2016, Canela was loaned to Série A club Chapecoense until December. He made his debut in the category on 4 August, replacing Hyoran in a 1–1 home draw against Palmeiras.

Death
On 28 November 2016, when Chapecoense were en route to the first leg of the 2016 Copa Sudamericana Finals to play against Atlético Nacional, Canela was among the fatalities of the LaMia Airlines Flight 2933 accident in the Colombian village of Cerro Gordo, La Unión, Antioquia.

Club statistics

Honours
Botafogo-SP
Campeonato Brasileiro Série D: 2015

Chapecoense
 Copa Sudamericana: 2016 (posthumously)

References

External links

1994 births
2016 deaths
People from Matão
Brazilian footballers
Association football forwards
Campeonato Brasileiro Série A players
Campeonato Brasileiro Série D players
Associação Atlética Internacional (Bebedouro) players
Atlético Monte Azul players
Botafogo Futebol Clube (SP) players
Associação Chapecoense de Futebol players
Footballers killed in the LaMia Flight 2933 crash
Footballers from São Paulo (state)